Innbygda is the administrative centre of Trysil municipality in Innlandet county, Norway.

Trysil Church is located in the centre of the village. The village also has several hotels and tourist businesses due to its location near the Trysilfjellet skiing area.

Climate
Innbygda has a subarctic climate (Köppen Dfc) with cold winters and warm summers. Precipitation is moderate at  annually.

References

Trysil
Villages in Innlandet